Grevillea trifida is a shrub of the genus Grevillea native to an area in the  South West and Great Southern regions of Western Australia.<ref name=FB>{{FloraBase|name=Grevillea trifida|id=2112}}</ref>

Description
It blooms between July and November and produces an axillary or terminal raceme irregular inflorescence with white or cream flowers and white to cream styles.

Taxonomy
It was first described as Anadenia trifida by the botanist Robert Brown in 1810, then transferred to genus Grevillea in 1845 by Carl Meissner in Proteaceae as a part of the Johann Georg Christian Lehmann work Plantae Preissianae. The only other synonym is Grevillea brevicuspis''.

Distribution
The range of the shrub extends from Pinjarra in the north southward to Augusta in the south west and Cheynes Beach (to the east of Albany in the south east. It is found in habitats that can be quite swampy and grows in sandy to gravelly soils.

See also
 List of Grevillea species

References

trifida
Endemic flora of Western Australia
Eudicots of Western Australia
Proteales of Australia
Taxa named by Carl Meissner